The 1982 Oregon Ducks football team represented the University of Oregon in the 1982 NCAA Division I-A football season. Playing as a member of the Pacific-10 Conference (Pac-10), the team was led by head coach Rich Brooks, in his sixth year, and played their home games at Autzen Stadium in Eugene, Oregon. They finished the season with a record of two wins, eight losses and one tie (2–8–1 overall, 2–6 in the Pac-10, ninth).

Schedule

Season summary

Oregon State

NFL Draft
Two Ducks were selected in the 1983 NFL Draft, which lasted twelve rounds (335 selections).

List of Oregon Ducks in the NFL draft

References

Oregon
Oregon Ducks football seasons
Oregon Ducks football